The Blue Mountain Fire Observation Station is a historic fire observation station located on Blue Mountain at Indian Lake in Hamilton County, New York. There are four contributing resources: the tower, trail, remnants of a 1949 observer's cabin, and 1890s stone benchmark. The tower is a prefabricated structure built by the Aermotor Corporation and provided a front line of defense in preserving the Adirondack Forest Preserve from the hazards of forest fires.

It was added to the National Register of Historic Places in 2001.

References

External links

The Fire Towers of New York

Government buildings on the National Register of Historic Places in New York (state)
Towers completed in 1917
Buildings and structures in Hamilton County, New York
Fire lookout towers in Adirondack Park
Fire lookout towers on the National Register of Historic Places in New York (state)
National Register of Historic Places in Hamilton County, New York